Sphering may refer to:

 The process of becoming a sphere
 Sphering, the recreation or sport of rolling downhill inside an orb, generally made of transparent plastic
 Sphering transformation, a decorrelation method that converts a covariance matrix of a set of samples into an identity matrix

See also 
 Sphere (disambiguation)